The 2002–03 Elitserien was the 69th season of the top division of Swedish handball. 12 teams competed in the league. The league was split into an autumn league and a spring league. The eight highest placed teams in the autumn league qualified for the spring league, whereas the four lowest placed teams qualified for Allsvenskan along with the highest placed teams from the autumn season of Division I (the second level). The six highest placed teams in the spring season of Elitserien qualified for the quarterfinals, whereas the two lowest placed teams qualified for the preliminary round of the playoffs, along with the two highest placed teams of Allsvenskan. Redbergslids IK won the regular season and also won the playoffs to claim their 20th Swedish title.

League tables

Autumn

Spring

Playoffs

First round

 Kroppskultur–H 43 22–27  
 H 43–Kroppskultur 23–26
H 43 won 50–48 on aggregate

 Guif–Hammarby 31–21  
 Hammarby–Guif 24–19  
Guif won 50–45 on aggregate

Quarterfinals

 Redbergslid–Guif 26–24  
 Guif–Redbergslid 23–34  
 Redbergslid–Guif 36–24  
Redbergslid won series 3–0

 Sävehof–Tumba 25–21  
 Tumba–Sävehof 19–30  
 Sävehof–Tumba 30–21  
Sävehof won series 3–0

 Drott–H 43 37–36  
 H 43–Drott 22–25  
 Drott–H 43 32–23  
Drott won series 3–0

 Ystad–Skövde 29–28  
 Skövde–Ystad 25–24  
 Ystad–Skövde 32–26  
 Skövde–Ystad 28–24  
 Ystad–Skövde 25–30
Skövde won series 3–2

Semifinals

 Sävehof–Drott 22–27  
 Drott–Sävehof 26–25  
 Sävehof–Drott 29–32  
Drott won series 3–0

 Redbergslid–Skövde 31–25  
 Skövde–Redbergslid 29–35  
 Redbergslid–Skövde 37–33
Redbergslid won series 3–0

Finals

 Redbergslid–Drott 31–24   
 Drott–Redbergslid 25–32  
 Redbergslid–Drott 35–20
Redbergslid won series 3–0

References 

Swedish handball competitions